Rio Grande do Norte was a  destroyer of the Brazilian Navy, serving from 1909 to 1944. She was named after the Brazilian state of Rio Grande do Norte.

Description and Construction

Steam for the turbines was provided by two double-ended Yarrow boilers.

The ship mounted two  guns in single mounts. In addition, four 47 mm (3pdr) cannons in single mounts were deployed at the time of launching.

References

Bibliography 
 "CT Rio Grande do Norte - CT 4." Navios De Guerra Brasileiros. Accessed 27 August 2017.
 Gardiner, Robert and Randal Gray, eds. Conway's All the World's Fighting Ships 1906–1921. Annapolis: Naval Institute Press, 1985. . .

Pará-class destroyers (1908)
1909 ships
Ships built in Glasgow